Aniss Karimi (Arabic:أنيس كريمي; born 12 April 2000) is a Moroccan footballer. He currently plays as a midfielder for Hatta on loan from Ittihad Kalba.

Career statistics

Club

References

External links
 

2000 births
Living people
Moroccan footballers
Moroccan expatriate footballers
Wydad AC players
Hatta Club players
Al-Ittihad Kalba SC players
UAE Pro League players
UAE First Division League players
Association football midfielders
Expatriate footballers in the United Arab Emirates
Moroccan expatriate sportspeople in the United Arab Emirates
Place of birth missing (living people)